The rivière aux Ormes (in English: Elm River) is a tributary of the east bank of the Huron River which constitutes a tributary of the south shore of the St. Lawrence River.

The Ormes river flows in the municipalities of Saint-Flavien, Saint-Janvier-de-Joly and Val-Alain, in the Lotbinière Regional County Municipality, in the administrative region of Chaudière-Appalaches, in Quebec, in Canada.

Geography 

The main neighboring watersheds of the Ormes river are:
 north side: Huron River, St. Lawrence River, Bois Franc-Pierreriche stream, Bourret stream;
 east side: Noire River (Huron River tributary), rivière aux Cèdres, Beaurivage River, rivière aux Pins;
 south side: rivière aux Cèdres, rivière aux Frênes, Henri River, rivière du Chêne;
 west side: rivière du Chêne.

The Ormes River has its source in the municipality of Saint-Flavien, north of the village, near the Pointe du Jour road.

  westward, in the municipality of Saint-Flavien;
  westward, to highway 20;
  towards the west, up to the confluence of the "Branche Coulombe" stream (coming from the east);
  westward, up to its confluence.

The Ormes River "flows into a bend in the river on the south bank of the Huron River in the municipality of Saint-Janvier-de-Joly. This confluence is located opposite the municipality of Saint-Édouard-de-Lotbinière.

Toponymy 
The toponym Rivière aux Ormes was formalized on December 5, 1968, at the Commission de toponymie du Québec.

See also 

 List of rivers of Quebec

References 

Rivers of Chaudière-Appalaches
Lotbinière Regional County Municipality